is the oldest surviving Japanese medical text. It was completed in 984 by Tamba Yasuyori (also referred in some sources as Tanba no Yasuyori) and is 30 volumes in length. The work is partly based on a Chinese medical work called Zhubing yuanhou lun (諸病源候論 General Treatise on Causes and Manifestations of All Diseases), compiled by Sui Dynasty writer Chao Yuanfang.  Many of the texts cited in Ishinpō have been lost in China, and have only survived to the present through their inclusion in the work. It is a national treasure of Japan.

The structural organization of the text is as follows:

The Ishinpō preserved more than 200 important medical documents that were all Chinese in origin and no Japanese sources. The medical knowledge in the tome  covered clinical treatments that drew from the ancient Chinese traditional medicine and influenced by Indian medical theories found in Buddhist scriptures as well as Taoist references (e.g. Taoist drugs). For instance, there was the so-called Scripture on Pregnancy, which outlined the physical developments and fetal movements. Scholars cite its similarity with a prescription from the old Chinese medical text called Taichan shu, which contained doctrines about the development of embryo and fetus as well as proper hygiene for pregnant women. 

The Ishinpō is also notable for preserving some of the Taoist sexual manuals from the Han to the Tang dynasty. The twenty-eighth section of the Ishinpō contains a complete transcription of a Daoist text known as The Classic of Sunu which is a dialogue between the Dark Maiden and the Yellow Emperor, with the former providing advice on sexual practices to the latter.

While the text is written in kanbun, Japanese terms are written to the side in Man'yōgana for plants, animals, and minerals.

Notes

References
 
Wile, Douglas. The Art of the Bedchamber: The Chinese Sexual Yoga Classics including Women’s Solo Meditation Texts. Albany: State University of New York, 1992.

External links

984
10th-century Japanese books
10th century in Japan
Healthcare in Japan
History of science and technology in Japan
Late Old Japanese texts
Old Japanese texts
Medical manuals
National Treasures of Japan
Traditional Japanese medicine
Heian-period books